Kings Oak is a neighborhood of St. Louis, Missouri.  The neighborhood is named for two of its streets that make up the neighborhood's boundaries.  "Kings" comes from Kingshighway Blvd., the neighborhood's eastern border and "Oak" comes from Oakland Ave., the neighborhood's northern border.  The neighborhood has a relatively low population and population density because Saint Louis University High School and the Saint Louis Science Center are located in this very small neighborhood.  There are also some industrial businesses along Manchester Ave., the neighborhood's southern border.  This leaves little room for houses, most of which are located on the neighborhood's eastern edge.

Demographics

In 2020 the population was 61.1% White, 31.7% Black, 0.6% Asian and 6.0% Two or More Races. 1.2% of the population was of Hispanic or Latino origin.

References

External links
 Kings Oak neighborhood website

Neighborhoods in St. Louis